Tropidophis xanthogaster, also known commonly as the Guanahacabibes dwarf boa and the Guanahacabibes trope, is a species of snake in the family Tropidophiidae (dwarf boas). The species is endemic to the Guanahacabibes Peninsula, in the province of Pinar del Río, western Cuba.

Etymology
The specific name, xanthogaster, from Greek xantho- (yellow) and gaster (venter), refers to the yellow underside of this species.

Habitat

Description
Dorsally, T. xanthogaster is grayish-brown with eight rows of dark brown spots. Ventrally, it is yellow.

Reproduction
T. xanthogaster is ovoviviparous.

References

Further reading
Domínguez M, Moreno LV, Hedges SB  (2006).  "A new snake of the genus Tropidophis (Tropidophiidae) from the Guanahacabibes Peninsula of western Cuba". Amphibia-Reptilia 27: 427-432. (Tropidophis xanthogaster, new species).

Tropidophiidae
Endemic fauna of Cuba
Reptiles of the Caribbean
Reptiles described in 2006